Bronson is a 2008 British biographical prison action thriller film directed by Nicolas Winding Refn, based on a script written by Refn and Brock Norman Brock. The film stars Tom Hardy as Michael Peterson, known from 1987 as Charles Bronson. The film follows the life of this prisoner, considered Britain's most violent criminal, who has been responsible for a dozen or so cases of hostage taking while incarcerated. He was given the name Charles Bronson by his fight promoter, for his bare-knuckle fighting years.

Born into a respectable middle-class family, Peterson became known as one of the United Kingdom's most dangerous prisoners. Because of his violence, Bronson was repeatedly put into isolation or solitary confinement, which may have contributed to his emotional problems.

Plot

The film begins with scenes from Peterson's delinquent early life which he narrates with self-deprecating humor. Initially he addresses the camera dressed in prison garb; other times, he tells his tale in a vaudeville-style theatre with a live audience. The film's story unfolds as a surreal narrative of connected vignettes punctuated by vaudeville interludes.

He recounts episodes of crime and violence leading to his first prison sentence of seven years. At sentencing, his mother hopes he will be out in four but his violence in prison extends his sentence beyond seven years. He is sent to a psychiatric hospital, where he continues to rebel and is administered drugs which he claims make him physically weak. His first escape attempt is to walk sluggishly toward the exit, where he is waved back to a chair by a staffer. He decides to escape by earning a transfer back to prison and attempts to strangle a detainee that revealed himself to be a paedophile, but is apprehended before he can kill the man. He comments to the audience that despite all his prison time and solitary confinement, he has never killed anyone.

In the vaudeville theatre, he shows film footage of a rooftop protest during which he claims to have caused "tens of millions of pounds' damage". He credits this destruction with the government's decision to declare him "sane" and have him released. After a brief reunion with his parents, he sets off to see his flamboyant Uncle Jack. He is welcomed and reintroduced to an old prison mate who promises to set him up as a bare-knuckle boxer, and gives him the name Charles Bronson, after the American actor.

Bronson enjoys the violence and showmanship of bare-knuckle boxing. Not content with his meagre winnings, he ups the stakes by fighting two opponents at once and even fights a dog. He proposes to a woman and steals a thousand-pound ring in the hope that she will marry him. She declines; after sixty-nine days of freedom, Bronson is sent back to jail.

He takes the prison librarian hostage and waits for reinforcements to arrive, alternately screaming at his hostage and peaceably enquiring after his family. When other guards arrive, he strips naked and forces the librarian to assist in applying his "body armor" of petroleum jelly, to make him harder to grab in the imminent brawl. After being restrained, he is warned by the prison governor that he will die inside if his behavior does not improve. Encouraged by a prison art teacher, who notices something special in his drawings, he becomes a model prisoner for a while, channeling his confusion and pain into vivid imagery of birds and grotesque creatures. When told that the art studio will be closing, Bronson attacks the teacher and holds him hostage.

While prison officials wait outside, he demands music be played. He paints his naked body black and ties the teacher to a post. He paints a moustache onto the teacher's face, forces an apple into his mouth and removes his hat and glasses to put on the teacher's head, making the teacher into a parody of a Magritte painting. After this human still-life has been arranged to his satisfaction, he accepts his fate, calling for the prison guards to burst in for yet another brawl, for which he will be sent back to solitary confinement.

Cast
 Tom Hardy as Michael Gordon Peterson / Charles Bronson
 Matt King as Paul Daniels, nightclub owner and former fellow prisoner
 James Lance as Phil Danielson, prison art teacher
 Amanda Burton as Charlie's mother
 Kelly Adams as Irene Peterson, Charlie's wife
 Juliet Oldfield as Alison, Charlie's lover
 Jonathan Phillips as the Prison Governor
 Mark Powley as Prison Officer Andy Love
  Hugh Ross as Uncle Jack
 Luing Andrews as Prison Officer
 Joe Tucker as John White, fellow patient in Rampton
 Gordon Brown as Screw, the first guard Bronson fights
 Charlie Whyman as fellow patient in Rampton

Production

For the role, Hardy had telephone conversations with Charles Bronson, before meeting him. Bronson was so impressed by how Hardy had managed to build up his physique for the role and how good he was at imitating him, that he shaved off his trademark moustache for it to be used as a prop for Hardy to wear in the film. "I honestly believe nobody on the planet could play me as Tom did. He is more like me than I am", Bronson told The Times. Filming was done in and around the St. Ann's and Sherwood districts of Nottingham, and Worksop and Welbeck Abbey in north Nottinghamshire.

In a late 2009 interview with Michael Slenske of Interview magazine, Tom Hardy discussed the fitness routine he had developed to get in shape to play Bronson,

Reception

Box office
Bronson grossed $2,260,712 at the box office.

Critical response
Upon release, Bronson received positive reviews, with many praising Hardy's performance, the film's writing and direction, as well as the humour and the action sequences, though it was criticised  for its violence. Rotten Tomatoes, a review aggregator, gives the film an approval rating of 76% based on reviews from 82 critics, with an average rating of 6.6 out of 10 with the consensus "Undeniably gripping, Bronson forces the viewer to make some hard decisions about where the line between art and exploitation lies." Metacritic gives the film a "generally favourable" average score of 71 out of 100 based on 22 reviews.

Roger Ebert gave the film three stars out of four and praised the decision not to attempt to rationalise and explain Bronson's behaviour, stating in his review:

Bronson was not initially allowed to view the film, but had said that if his mother liked it, he was sure he would as well. According to Refn's DVD audio commentary, his mother said she loved it. On 15 November 2011, he was granted permission to view it. Describing it as "theatrical, creative, and brilliant", Bronson heaped praise upon Hardy, but disagreed on the implied distance between himself and his father; and the portrayal of Paul Edmunds, a former prisoner and nightclub owner (portrayed in the film by Matt King as Paul Daniels) as "a bit of a ponce". Bronson challenged his own family's reaction to the portrayal of his Uncle Jack, stating that he "loved" it, as would Jack himself. Bronson's trust in Hardy's acting grew such that once he had seen the film, he said, "If I were to die in jail then at least I live on through Britain's No 1 actor". Bronson had been originally displeased with the choice of Hardy as star, but during their first meeting in person, Hardy assured him that he would "fix it".

External links

References

2008 films
2000s biographical films
2000s prison drama films
Biographical films about criminals
British biographical films
British prison drama films
Crime films based on actual events
Drama films based on actual events
Films directed by Nicolas Winding Refn
Films set in the 1970s
Films set in the 1980s
Films set in the 1990s
Films set in Luton
Films set in England
Films shot in Cornwall
Films shot in Nottinghamshire
Magnet Releasing films
Vertigo Films films
2000s English-language films
2000s American films
2000s British films